Chris Barton (born June 7, 1988 in Sacramento) is an American former professional road cyclist. He rode in the 2011 Giro d'Italia.

Major results
2008
 1st Stage 3 Tour of Belize (TTT)
2009
 5th Overall Le Triptyque des Monts et Châteaux
2013
 2nd Time trial, National Amateur Road Championships
2015
 1st Stage 3 Valley of the Sun Stage Race

References

1988 births
Living people
American male cyclists